Reverend Alvin Allison "Al" Carmines, Jr. (July 25, 1936 – August 9, 2005) was a key figure in the expansion of Off-Off-Broadway theatre in the 1960s.

Carmines was born in Hampton, Virginia. Although his musical talent appeared early, he decided to enter the ministry, attending Swarthmore College, majoring in English and philosophy, and then Union Theological Seminary in the City of New York, earning a bachelor of divinity in 1961 and a master of sacred theology in 1963.

Carmines was hired by Howard Moody as an assistant minister at Judson Memorial Church on Washington Square Park, New York, to found a theater in the sanctuary of the Greenwich Village church in conjunction with playwright Robert Nichols. He began composing in 1962 and acted as well. His Bible study group grew into the Rauschenbusch Memorial United Church of Christ, with Carmines as pastor.

Carmines taught at Union Theological Seminary and received the Vernon Rice Award for his performance and the Drama Desk Award for Lyrics and Music and was awarded the Obie award for Life Time Achievements.

Carmines is perhaps best remembered in the church for the hymn "Many Gifts, One Spirit" #114 in the United Methodist Hymnal. He was commissioned by the United Methodist Women to write this hymn for their General Assembly in 1974.

Carmines' musicals reflected his eclectic interests, including:
 Abraham Lincoln,
 Christmas,
 Gertrude Stein,
 Aristophanes,
 Winnie the Pooh,
 gay relationships, and
 St. Joan.

Carmines' Judson Poets' Theater, with other burgeoning theatres Café Cino, La MaMa E.T.C. and Theatre Genesis were experimental and vibrant challenges to the commercialization and conformity of Off Broadway and Broadway houses.

His 1973 musical The Faggot was a succès d'estime which transferred from the Judson Memorial Church to the Truck and Warehouse Theatre and ran for 203 performances.

In 1977, he had a cerebral aneurysm that required months of therapy. He underwent surgery a second time in 1985, which only then cured his crippling headaches.  He died in St. Vincent's Hospital in New York.

Carmines found as much spiritual meaning in the theater as the church: "If you want to know how to live, go to church.  If you want to know how your life is in its deepest roots, go to the theater."

Theatre credits 
 What Happened (1963) - composer; a setting for the works of Gertrude Stein
 Home Movies/Softly Consider the Nearness (1964) - composer, actor
 Patter for a Soft Shoe Dance (1964) - composer
 Sing Ho for a Bear (1964) - composer, actor (as Winnie the Pooh)
 Gorilla Queen (1967) - composer, lyricist
 San Francisco's Burning (1967) - composer
 Song of Songs - composer; a cantata based on the Bible
 The Sayings of Mao Tse-tung (1968) - composer; another cantata
 In Circles (1968) - composer, actor
 Peace (1969) - composer; an adaptation from Aristophanes
 Christmas Rappings (from 1969) - lyrics, music, actor, director; annual Xmas show held at Judson Memorial Church, and eventually taped for a television special
 Promenade (1969) - composer, musical director
 The Urban Crisis (1969) - composer, lyricist; a "secular oratorio"
  About Time (1970) - composer; another oratorio
 W.C. (1971) - composer, lyricist; a musical based on the life of W. C. Fields, which starred Mickey Rooney and Bernadette Peters but closed out-of-town
 The Journey of Snow White (1971) - composer, lyricist
 The Duel (1972); composer, lyricist; an opera based on the lives of Alexander Hamilton and Aaron Burr
 Joan (1972) - librettist, composer, lyricist, actor, director
 A Look at the Fifties (1972) - composer, lyricist;
 Wanted (1972) - composer;
"The Making of Americans" (1972 - composer and performer,  text by Gertrude Stein adapted by Leon Katz, Directed by Lawrence Kornfeld
 The Faggot (1973) - composer, lyricist, director, actor
 Listen to me (1974) - composer; another Gertrude Stein adaptation
 "A Manoir" (1977) composer, text by Gertrude Stein, directed by Lawrence Kornfeld
 "Doctor Faustus Lights the Lights" (1979) composer, text by Gertrude Stein, directed by Lawrence Kornfeld, starring Jeff Weiss
 T.S. Eliot: Midwinter Vigil(ante) (1981) - composer, lyricist, director; last show at Judson Church
 Romance Language (1984) - actor (as Walt Whitman)
 The Making of Americans (1985) - composer & lyricist, libretto by Leon Katz
 The Comedy of Errors (1992) - actor (as Duke/Balthazar)
 Máslova (1989) - inspired by the Leo Tolstoy novel, Resurrection—composer, co-lyricist with David Boles, book by David Boles
 Martyrs and Lullabies (1996) - an opera featuring Dietrich Bonhoeffer, Gertrude Stein, and Bessie Smith.

Awards and nominations 
 1964 Obie Award for Best Music - for Home Movies/Softly Consider the Nearness
 1968 Drama Desk Award (Vernon Rice-Drama Desk Award) - the music from In Circles
 1968 Obie Award for Best Musical - for In Circles
 1969 Drama Desk Award for Outstanding Music - for Peace
 1974 Drama Desk Award for Outstanding Lyrics - for The Faggot
 1974 Drama Desk Award for Outstanding Music - for The Faggot
 2003 Robert Chesley Award for gay and lesbian Playwriting

References

1936 births
2005 deaths
American male composers
Musicians from Hampton, Virginia
Swarthmore College alumni
20th-century American composers
20th-century American male musicians